Nikola Dimitrijević (born 10 May 1991) is a Serbian footballer who plays for FK Javor Ivanjica.

Club career
Dimitrijević started his career at Obilić, and later played for Voždovac, PKB Padinska Skela, Srem, Smederevo, Spartak Bánovce and Zemun. He signed a two-year contract with Metalac Gornji Milanovac in summer 2015. After a season with Metalac, Dimitrijević joined Novi Pazar in summer 2016. He also played with Rad in early 2017.

Career statistics

Honours
PKB Padinska Skela
Belgrade Zone League: 2010–11
Zemun
Serbian League Belgrade: 2014–15

References

External links
 Nikola Dimitrijević stats at utakmica.rs
 
 
 

1991 births
Living people
Footballers from Belgrade
Association football defenders
Serbian footballers
FK Obilić players
FK Voždovac players
FK Srem players
FK Smederevo players
FK Zemun players
FK Metalac Gornji Milanovac players
FK Novi Pazar players
FK Rad players
FC ViOn Zlaté Moravce players
FK Inđija players
Slovak Super Liga players
3. Liga (Slovakia) players
Serbian First League players
Serbian SuperLiga players
Serbian expatriate footballers
Serbian expatriate sportspeople in Slovakia
Expatriate footballers in Slovakia